Barricades & Brickwalls is the second studio album by Australian country music singer Kasey Chambers released in Australia on 3 September 2001 by Essence Records and on 12 February 2002 on Warner Bros. Records in the U.S. The album was mainly written by Chambers with help from Worm Werchon and her father Bill Chambers. Barricades & Brickwalls debuted in the top ten on the Australian ARIA Albums Chart, and sales were considerably high of those of Chambers first album, The Captain (1999). Its singles were successful in most music markets, "Not Pretty Enough", the most successful song from the album gave Chambers her first number-one single in Australia and reached #4 in New Zealand. Other singles includes "Runaway Train", "On a Bad Day", "Million Tears" and "If I Were You". The commercial success of the album led the album to eight nominations at the ARIA Awards.

The song "Not Pretty Enough" reached number-one on the Australian ARIA charts, going double platinum, and Chambers became the first musical act in Australian history to have an album and single sit at the top of the charts at the same time.  The singles "Million Tears" and "If I Were You" would later reach the top forty charts.  The album did not reach quite the same audience in the United States, not quite hitting the Billboard Hot 100.  It did, however, reach the top of the Heatseekers chart as well as hitting the top 20 country albums. The track "Crossfire" features The Living End.

The album would end up going platinum in 2002, becoming the highest selling album by an Australian artist in that year, along with the highest selling single.  Chambers, because of the success of this album, won "Best Country Album," "Best Female Artist," and "Album of the Year" at the 2002 ARIA awards. In October 2010, the album was listed in the top 40 in the book, 100 Best Australian Albums.

Track listing

Charts

Year-end charts

Decade-end chart

Certifications

References

2001 albums
ARIA Award-winning albums
Kasey Chambers albums